Pseudatemelia chalcocrates is a moth of the family Oecophoridae. It was described by Edward Meyrick in 1930. It is found in Croatia.

The wingspan is 10–11 mm. The forewings are bronzy fuscous with a slight violet tinge. The hindwings are dark fuscous. Adults have been recorded in June and July.

References

Moths described in 1930
Amphisbatinae